Kan Qingzi (born 15 April 1988) is a Chinese actress. She graduated from the Beijing Film Academy.

Career
In 2008, Kan made her acting debut in the television series The Dream of Red Mansions based on the novel by the same name by Cao Xueqin. She then portrayed young Empress Dowager Cixi in the 2010 historical drama The Firmament of the Pleiades .

In 2011, Kan became known to audience for her role in the historical romance comedy New My Fair Princess.

In 2013, Kan gained recognition for her performance as a black-bellied in the romance drama Shining Days.

In 2014, Kan starred in the period romance drama Moment in Peking based on Lin Yutang's  novel of the same name. The same year, she played the lead role in the horror film Enchanted Doll.

In 2016, Kan starred in the spy drama Sparrow. The drama received critical acclaim for its performance and storyline, and became the highest rated war drama to date with a peak rating of 2.46.  Kan was nominated for the Best Actress award at the China TV Golden Eagle Award for her performance.

In 2017, Kan starred in the youth romance drama Art in Love. The drama received positive reviews and had 4 billion views online. The same year, she featured in the fantasy epic drama Tribes and Empires: Storm of Prophecy as a princess; and played the female lead in the historical mystery drama Detective Dee.

In 2019, Kan starred in the spy drama Awakening of Insects, the sequel to Sparrow. The same year she starred in the romance anthology film Adoring directed by Xu Zheng.

Filmography

Film

Television series

Television show

Discography

Awards and nominations

References

External links
 
 Kan Qingzi on Douban

1988 births
Living people
Beijing Film Academy alumni
Actresses from Harbin
21st-century Chinese actresses
Manchu actresses